Geneva is an unincorporated community in Noble Township, Shelby County, in the U.S. state of Indiana.

History
Geneva was platted in 1853. The community took its name after Geneva, in Switzerland. An old variant name of the community was called Sulphur Hill.

A post office was established under the name Sulphur Hill in 1836, and remained in operation until it was discontinued in 1904.

Geography

References

Unincorporated communities in Shelby County, Indiana
Unincorporated communities in Indiana
Indianapolis metropolitan area